New Forest was a county constituency in south-west Hampshire which elected one Member of Parliament (MP) to the House of Commons of the Parliament of the United Kingdom.

It was first created under the Redistribution of Seats Act for the 1885 general election, and was abolished for the 1918 general election, when it was partially replaced by the New Forest and Christchurch constituency.

The seat was re-established for the 1950 general election and those thereafter, was significantly cut in size on the creation of the seat of Romsey in 1983 and was abolished for the 1997 general election, when the New Forest East and New Forest West seats were created using its remaining components.

In the British TV series House of Cards, this was the constituency represented by the main character, Francis Urquhart.

Boundaries
1885–1918: The Municipal Borough of Romsey, the Sessional Divisions of Lymington and Ringwood, part of the Sessional Division of Romsey, and the civil parishes of Chilworth and North Shoreham.

1950–1955: The Municipal Borough of Lymington, and the Rural Districts of New Forest, and Ringwood and Fordingbridge.

1955–1974: The Municipal Borough of Lymington, the Rural District of Ringwood and Fordingbridge, and part of the Rural District of New Forest.

1974–1983: The Rural Districts of New Forest, and Ringwood and Fordingbridge.

1983–1997: The District of New Forest wards of Barton, Bashley, Becton, Boldre, Bransgore and Sopley, Brockenhurst, Copythorne South, Downlands, Fordingbridge, Forest North, Forest North West, Forest South, Forest West, Hordle, Lymington Town, Lyndhurst, Milford, Milton, Pennington, Ringwood North, Ringwood South, and Sway.

Members of Parliament

MPs 1885–1918

MPs 1950–1997

Elections

Elections in the 1880s

Elections in the 1890s

Elections in the 1900s

Elections in the 1910s

Elections in the 1950s

Elections in the 1960s

Elections in the 1970s

Elections in the 1980s

Elections in the 1990s

See also 
List of parliamentary constituencies in Hampshire

Notes and references 

Parliamentary constituencies in Hampshire (historic)
Constituencies of the Parliament of the United Kingdom established in 1885
Constituencies of the Parliament of the United Kingdom disestablished in 1918
Constituencies of the Parliament of the United Kingdom established in 1950
Constituencies of the Parliament of the United Kingdom disestablished in 1997
New Forest District